Ray Scott may refer to:

Sports
Ray Scott (angler), American outdoorsman and founder of B.A.S.S.
Ray Scott (sportscaster) (1919–1998), American sportscaster
Ray Scott (basketball) (born 1938), American basketball player and coach
Ray Scott (Australian rules football) (1927–2003), Australian rules football player and umpire

Other people
Raymond Scott (1908–1994), American composer and bandleader
Ray Scott (singer) (born 1975), American country music singer
Ray Scott (politician), Colorado state senator

See also 
 Scott (name)